Shangdu County (Mongolian:   Šaŋdu siyan, Шанду шянь) is a county of south-central  Inner Mongolia, People's Republic of China.

Climate

References

www.xzqh.org: 商都县—内蒙古自治区—中国—行政区划网 (in Chinese)

External links
Shangdu County Government

County-level divisions of Inner Mongolia
Ulanqab